The 2018 U.S. Poker Open was the inaugural season of the U.S. Poker Open. It took place from February 1-11 at the Aria Resort and Casino in Las Vegas, Nevada. Poker Central sponsored the event, with every final table streamed live on PokerGo. There were eight events, including Pot Limit Omaha and Mixed Game tournaments, with buy-ins ranging between $10,000 and $50,000. It culminated in the $50,000 No Limit Hold'em Main Event.

Stephen Chidwick won the series championship, winning two events and making the final table of five out of eight events. Keith Tilston won the Main Event.

Schedule

Series leaderboard

Results

Event #1: $10,000 No Limit Hold'em

 2-Day Event: February 1-2
 Number of Entries: 68
 Total Prize Pool: $680,000
 Number of Payouts: 10
 Winning Hand:

Event #2: $10,000 Pot Limit Omaha

 2-Day Event: February 2-3
 Number of Entries: 64
 Total Prize Pool: $640,000
 Number of Payouts: 10
 Winning Hand:

Event #3: $25,000 No Limit Hold'em

 2-Day Event: February 3-4
 Number of Entries: 44
 Total Prize Pool: $1,100,000
 Number of Payouts: 7
 Winning Hand:

Event #4: $25,000 Mixed Game Championship

 2-Day Event: February 5-6
 Number of Entries: 45
 Total Prize Pool: $1,125,000
 Number of Payouts: 7
 Winning Hand:  (2-7 Triple Draw)

Event #5: $10,000 No Limit Hold'em

 2-Day Event: February 6-7
 Number of Entries: 67
 Total Prize Pool: $670,000
 Number of Payouts: 10
 Winning Hand:

Event #6: $25,000 No Limit Hold'em

 2-Day Event: February 7-8
 Number of Entries: 49
 Total Prize Pool: $1,225,000
 Number of Payouts: 7
 Winning Hand:

Event #7: $25,000 No Limit Hold'em

 2-Day Event: February 8-9
 Number of Entries: 50
 Total Prize Pool: $1,249,500
 Number of Payouts: 8
 Winning Hand:

Event #8: $50,000 No Limit Hold'em Main Event

 3-Day Event: February 9-11
 Number of Entries: 33
 Total Prize Pool: $1,650,000
 Number of Payouts: 5
 Winning Hand:

References

External links
Results

2018 in poker
2018 in sports in Nevada
Television shows about poker
Poker tournaments